Brigadier H. D. Twum-Barimah was a Ghanaian military personnel and a former Chief of Army Staff of the Ghana Army. He served as Chief of Army Staff from October 1971 to January 1972.

References

Ghanaian military personnel
Chiefs of Army Staff (Ghana)